Chidiebere Chijioke Nwakali  (born 26 December 1996) is a Nigerian professional footballer who currently plays for Saudi club Tuwaiq.

Club career
On 20 January 2014, Nwakali signed a four-year deal with Manchester City from Shuttle Sports Academy, after impressing with Nigeria under-17s in 2013 FIFA U-17 World Cup. He was also a part of the first team's pre-season tour to USA in July.

On 31 January 2015, Nwakali was loaned to Málaga CF until June 2017, being assigned to the reserves in Tercera División. He made his senior debut on 22 February, starting in a 1–0 home win against Antequera CF.

On 31 August 2015, Nwakali was loaned to Segunda División side Girona FC, in a season-long deal. However, he had to wait until 5 October to be officially available, due to a work permit.

On 31 March 2016, Nwakali terminated his loan with the Catalans, after failing to play a single minute for the club, and immediately joined Tippeligaen side IK Start. On 2 April he made his professional debut, coming on as a second-half substitute for Mathias Rasmussen in a 1–0 home loss against Viking FK.

On 8 February 2017, Nwakali moved to Sogndal Fotball on loan.

He was then loaned to Aberdeen in January 2018.

In summer 2018, he joined Polish club Raków Częstochowa but after just two appearances in all competitions, he left the club due to personal reasons.

On 22 January 2019, Kalmar FF announced that they had signed Nwakali on a four-year contract. In February 2020 Nwakali was sacked from Kalmar FF over his failure to return on time from Christmas break 

On 21 May, Nwakali traveled to the remote Faroe Islands for a trial with last season's champions, KÍ Klaksvík.

Career statistics

Honours
FIFA U-17 World Cup: 2013

References

External links

1996 births
Living people
People from Owerri
Nigerian footballers
Association football defenders
Manchester City F.C. players
Atlético Malagueño players
Girona FC players
IK Start players
Sogndal Fotball players
Aberdeen F.C. players
Raków Częstochowa players
Kalmar FF players
Tuwaiq Club players
Scottish Professional Football League players
Eliteserien players
I liga players
TFF First League players
Saudi Second Division players
Nigeria under-20 international footballers
Nigerian expatriate footballers
Nigerian expatriate sportspeople in England
Nigerian expatriate sportspeople in Scotland
Nigerian expatriate sportspeople in Norway
Nigerian expatriate sportspeople in Spain
Nigerian expatriate sportspeople in Turkey
Nigerian expatriate sportspeople in Saudi Arabia
Expatriate footballers in England
Expatriate footballers in Scotland
Expatriate footballers in Norway
Expatriate footballers in Spain
Expatriate footballers in Turkey
Expatriate footballers in Saudi Arabia
Nigeria youth international footballers
Sportspeople from Imo State